Chisago Lake is a lake in Chisago County, Minnesota, in the United States. "Chisago" is a name derived from two Ojibwe language words meaning "large" and "beautiful".

Chisago Lake holds numerous species of fish. Northern pike, largemouth bass, crappie, perch, walleye, and panfish make up the majority of the lake's fish population, although some muskellunge and common carp have also been found in surveys by the DNR.

References

Lakes of Minnesota
Lakes of Chisago County, Minnesota